The 2023 Women's Hockey Junior Asia Cup will be the eighth edition of the Women's Hockey Junior Asia Cup, the women's international under-21 field hockey championship of Asia organized by the Asian Hockey Federation. It will be held from 2 to 11 June 2023 in Kakamigahara, Japan.

The top three teams will qualify for the 2023 Women's FIH Hockey Junior World Cup in Santiago, Chile.

Qualification

See also
 2023 Men's Hockey Junior Asia Cup

References

Women's Hockey Junior Asia Cup
Junior Asia Cup
Hockey Asia Cup
Hockey Junior Asia Cup
International women's field hockey competitions hosted by Japan
Sport in Gifu Prefecture
Kakamigahara, Gifu
Hockey Junior Asia Cup
Asia Cup